The Pace That Thrills is a 1925 American silent drama film directed by Webster Campbell and starring Ben Lyon, Mary Astor, and Charles Byer. It was released by First National.

Plot
As described in a film magazine review, a motion picture actor, whose mother is in prison for the murder of her drunken husband, refuses to take chances with his life on the lot and is considered a coward. He dare not risk accident and the consequent curtailment of his earning power because he needs money to secure his mother’s pardon. He is secretly in love with his producer’s daughter, but she too thinks him cowardly. However, he proves himself in a quick succession of events, and frees his mother and wins the affections of the young woman.

Cast

Preservation
With no prints of The Pace That Thrills located in any film archives, it is a lost film.

References

Bibliography
 Lowe, Denise. An Encyclopedic Dictionary of Women in Early American Films: 1895-1930. Routledge, 2014.

External links

Stills at silenthollywood.com

1925 films
1925 drama films
Silent American drama films
American silent feature films
1920s English-language films
First National Pictures films
American black-and-white films
1925 lost films
Lost drama films
Lost American films
1920s American films